Stephen W. Bisenius (born June 16, 1947) is an American Republican politician. He served as a member of the Iowa Senate from 1977 to 1983, representing Dubuque County.

References

Living people
1947 births
People from Cascade, Iowa
Samford University alumni
Republican Party Iowa state senators